is the former publisher and editor of The Perl Review, a magazine devoted to Perl and co-author of several books on Perl including Learning Perl, Intermediate Perl and Mastering Perl. He is also the founder of Perl Mongers, the founder of the White Camel Awards, a frequent speaker at conferences including The Perl Conference and YAPC (Yet Another Perl Conference). He is the author of multiple Perl modules on CPAN and maintains the perlfaq portions of the core Perl documentation. He was a partner at Stonehenge Consulting Services from 1998 to 2009.

PerlPowerTools 
In 2014 he revitalized the PerlPowerTools AKA PPT project.
In February 1999, Tom Christiansen announced the PerlPowerTools project to provide a unified BSD toolbox,
i.e. a reimplementation of the classic Unix command set in pure Perl.
Perl is the same (mostly) everywhere you go and the same programs could run the same everywhere instead of being reimplemented for each platform.

Bibliography
 Learning Perl,  (fourth edition, 2005)
 Learning Perl,  (fifth edition, 2008)
 Learning Perl,  (sixth edition, 2011)
 Learning Perl,  (seventh edition, 2016)
 Student Workbook for Learning Perl,  (2005)
 Learning Perl Student Workbook,  (second edition, 2012)
 Intermediate Perl,  (2006)
 Intermediate Perl,  (second edition, 2012)
 Mastering Perl,  (2007)
 Mastering Perl,  (second edition, 2014)
 Effective Perl Programming: Ways to Write Better, More Idiomatic Perl,  (second edition, 2010)
 Programming Perl,  (fourth edition, 2011)
 Learning Perl 6,  (2018)

References

External links
 Author page on O'Reilly Media

Living people
American computer programmers
American technology writers
Perl writers
O'Reilly writers
Pseudonymous writers
American magazine publishers (people)
Year of birth missing (living people)